Farrel Island (Spanish: Isla Farrel) is an island in the Magallanes Region, Chile.

Islands of Magallanes Region